is a traditional confectionery company located in Kita-ku, Kyoto, Japan. It was established in the year 1000 and is operated by the 25th generation of the same family. The recent building is about 300 years old and contains many benches and stools around small tables. Local people call the shop "Ichiwa".

The business was founded to provide refreshments to pilgrims coming to pray at the adjacent Imamiya Shrine, a holy place founded in 994.

The restaurant produces and sells wagashi, traditional Japanese confections often served with tea, namely:
aburi-mochi (or "aburimochi")- roasted rice cake in a sweet miso sauce
green tea, etc.

Over the centuries there have been minor changes made in concession to modernity. The water used for the mochi was originally sourced from a small spring in the shop's cellar, however this was changed after local health officials prohibited the use of well water. They now use a mochi machine to mechanically pound rice. After World War II they moved from charging on the honor system to a fixed price per plate.

There is another old confectionery called Kazariya (Kasuragi) founded in 1656, but about 200 years ago its owner changed.

See also
 List of oldest companies

References

External links

"Oldest Wagashi store in Japan: Ichimonjiya Wasuke"
official FaceBook

Japanese confectionery
Manufacturing companies based in Kyoto
Japanese brand foods
1000s establishments in Japan
1000 establishments in Asia
Confectionery companies of Japan
Companies established in the 9th century